Don't Believe In Fairy Tales was the second album released by New Zealand band Mother Goose.

Track listing

Living In A Silent Movie 4:31
Saving For A Rainy Day 4:44
Alice (It's Up To You) 4:24
Once Upon A Time 5:55
All the Kings Horses 4:10
Paint It Black 4:48 
Taking A Chance On You 3:25
Soliloquy 1:45
Don't Believe In Fairy Tales 3:45

Charts

References

1979 albums